Abertridwr railway station was a station which served Abertridwr, in the Welsh county of Glamorgan. It was served by trains on the line from Caerphilly to Senghenydd. The nearest station to Abertridwr is now Aber.

History

Opened as Aber by the Rhymney Railway it became part of the Great Western Railway during the Grouping of 1923. The line then passed on to the Western Region of British Railways on nationalisation in 1948. It was then closed by the British Railways Board.

The site today

The old platform can be seen in the ground.

References

Sources

External links
Station on navigable O. S. map

Disused railway stations in Caerphilly County Borough
Beeching closures in Wales
Railway stations in Great Britain opened in 1894
Railway stations in Great Britain closed in 1964
Former Rhymney Railway stations
1894 establishments in Wales
1964 disestablishments in Wales